The Asociación de Profesores y Monitores en Llingua Llïonesa or APMLL (Leonese Language Teachers and Monitor Association) is a Leonese language association where are integrated the teachers and monitors that teach this language. It was founded in 2007 in Leon, Castile and Leon, Spain, and has members from the provinces of Llión, Zamora and Salamanca.

Activities
They have participated in several activities for promoting Leonese language, as Leonese language Day in 2008 or the Mother Language Day in 2009, where they signed a communicate with the Leonese language associations for promoting this language.

See also
 Leonese language
 Leonese language writers

External links
 Asociación de Profesores y Monitores de Llingua Llïonesa
 Asociación Cultural de la Llingua Llïonesa El Fueyu
 Top Level Domain for Leonese Language

References

Leonese language
Leonese language associations